
David Francis Pears, FBA (8 August 1921 – 1 July 2009) was a British philosopher renowned for his work on Ludwig Wittgenstein.

An Old Boy of Westminster School, he was in the Royal Artillery during World War II, and was seriously injured in a practice gas attack. After leaving the army he studied classics at Balliol College, Oxford, and was then for many years a Student (Fellow) of Christ Church, Oxford.

Bibliography
 Ludwig Wittgenstein. Viking Press 1970.
 Motivated Irrationality. Oxford: Clarendon Press 1984.
 The False Prison: A Study of the Development of Wittgenstein's Philosophy. 2 vols. Oxford: Oxford University Press 1987/1988.
 Hume's System: An Examination of the First Book of His Treatise. Oxford: Oxford University Press 1991.
 Paradox and Platitude in Wittgenstein's Philosophy. Oxford: Oxford University Press 2006.

References

Further reading
 David Charles and William Child (Eds.). Wittgensteinian Themes: Essays in Honour of David Pears. Oxford: Oxford University Press 2002.

External links 

"Pears, David Francis (1921–2009), philosopher". Oxford Dictionary of National Biography. (Archived by Wayback Machine).
"David Francis Pears 1921–2009" - British Academy Memoir of Pears by Christopher Peacocke, FBA.
"The Idea of Freedom" (1972)  A philosophical conversation between Iris Murdoch and David Pears on ethics, freedom, determinism, and Freud, from the Logic Lane series of educational films by Michael Chanan.

British philosophers
1921 births
2009 deaths
Alumni of Balliol College, Oxford
British Army personnel of World War II
Fellows of Christ Church, Oxford
People educated at Westminster School, London
Royal Artillery officers
Wittgensteinian philosophers